This Is America is a 1942 book with text by First Lady Eleanor Roosevelt and photographs by Frances Cooke Macgregor published by G. P. Putnam's and Sons, New York. The title This Is America coincided with the 1942 series of wartime posters by the Sheldon-Claire company of Chicago, "This is America... Keep it Free".

References 

1942 non-fiction books
Eleanor Roosevelt
Books written by first ladies of the United States
Books about the United States
G. P. Putnam's Sons books